Rajpur is a town and former minor Rajput princely state on Saurashtra peninsula in Gujarat, western India.

History
The Sixth Class princely state in Jhalawar prant was ruled by Jhala Rajput Chieftains. It also comprised two more villages.

In 1901 it has a population of 1,718, yielding a state revenue of 26,883 Rupees (1903-4, mostly from land), paying a 2,598 Rupees tribute to the British and the Junagadh State.

External links
 Imperial Gazetteer on dsal.uchicago.edu - Kathiawar

Princely states of Gujarat
Rajput princely states